LaMoure may refer to:

 LaMoure, North Dakota
 LaMoure County, North Dakota
 La Moure Township, North Dakota, in Pembina County